Placido may refer to:

People

Surname
José Plácido de Castro (1873–1908), Brazilian soldier and politician
Michele Placido, (born 1946) Italian actor and director
Plácido Vega y Daza, (1830-1878) 19th century Mexican general and politician
Mike De Placido, (born 1954)  English footballer
Violante Placido, actress, singer, and daughter of Michele Placido

Given name
Placido (Tonkawa leader) (c.1790—1862) chieftain of the Tonkawa Indians of Texas
Placido Columbani, 18th-century Italian architectural designer, who worked chiefly in England
Placido Costanzi, (1702-1759) Italian painter
Plácido Domingo, (born 1941) Spanish operatic tenor
Placido Falconio, aka "Falconi", 16th-century Italian composer
Plácido Polanco, (born 1975) Dominican Major League Baseball player
Placido Puccinelli, (1609-1685) 17th-century Cassinese monk, historian and scholar
Placido Rizzotto (1914–1948), Italian partisan, socialist peasant and trade union leader
Plácido Rodriguez, (born 1940) Mexican-born priest and current bishop of Lubbock, Texas
Placido Zurla, (1769-1834) 19th-century Italian writer and Cardinal Vicar of Rome
Placido Flamingo, an opera-singing flamingo on Sesame Street named after Plácido Domingo, mainly appearing in the 1980s
 (1809–1844), also known as Plácido, Cuban poet and revolutionary

Places
Plácido de Castro, Acre, Brazil
Plácido Aderaldo Castelo, a stadium in Fortaleza, Ceará, Brazil

Films
Plácido (film), a 1961 Spanish film directed by Luis García Berlanga